Roe Cobblestone Schoolhouse is a historic one room school located at Butler in Wayne County, New York.  The cobblestone building is a one-story, 28 feet long by 22 feet deep, three bay wide structure. It was built about 1820 and is constructed of irregularly shaped, multi-colored, field cobbles. It ceased to function as a school in 1932, used as a single family residence, and is now operated as a schoolhouse museum by the Butler Historical Society, which also operates the Butler Church Museum. Both museums are open on the first Saturday of the month from May through October.

The structure is among the approximately 170 surviving cobblestone buildings in Wayne County. It was listed on the National Register of Historic Places in 2008.

References

External links

 Butler Historical Society
 Butler Historical Preservation Society - listing from Wayne County
 http://www.waymarking.com/waymarks/WM47YB_Roe_Cobblestone_Schoolhouse_South_Butler_New_York - Waymarking.com information

One-room schoolhouses in New York (state)
Schoolhouses in the United States
School buildings on the National Register of Historic Places in New York (state)
Cobblestone architecture
School buildings completed in 1820
History museums in New York (state)
Museums in Wayne County, New York
Historical society museums in New York (state)
Education museums in the United States
National Register of Historic Places in Wayne County, New York